The 1900 Delaware gubernatorial election was held on November 6, 1900. Though Governor Ebe W. Tunnell was eligible for re-election under the newly adopted 1897 constitution, the state convention ended up nominating Peter J. Ford, a prominent businessman. 

On the Republican side, the split from four years earlier threatened to divide the party once again. The Addicks and anti-Addicks Republicans nominated separate candidates for Governor. The anti-Addicks (or "Regular Republicans") nominated attorney Martin B. Burris, while the Addicks (or "Union Republicans") nominated Dr. George W. Marshall. Both factions, however, nominated John Hunn for Lieutenant Governor. 

Though initial negotiations between the factions failed to produce a reconciliation, a tentative agreement developed to form a joint ticket, adopting Hunn as a compromise for Governor splitting nominations for statewide offices among the two factions. Ultimately, the parties came to an agreement, and a joint ticket was nominated for the general election.

In the general election, Hunn ended up defeating Ford by a decisive margin, reclaiming the governorship for the Republican Party. Republicans would end up holding onto the office until 1936.

General election

References

Bibliography
 Delaware Senate Journal, 88th General Assembly, 1st Reg. Sess. (1901).

1900
Delaware
Gubernatorial
November 1900 events